Knock, knock, ginger (also known as ding, dong, ditch in the United States) is a prank or game dating back to 19th-century England, or possibly the earlier Cornish traditional holiday of Nickanan Night. The game is played by children in many cultures. It involves knocking on the front door (or ringing the doorbell) of a victim, then running away before the door can be answered.

The name knock, knock, ginger, “knock down ginger” or knocky door ginger, used in parts of Southern England, is attested at least as early as 1967, in an English poem found in the "Childhood in Poetry" collection:
Ginger, Ginger broke a winder
Hit the winda – crack!
The baker came out to give 'im a clout
And landed on his back.

Name variations 

The game in various forms is known by different names geographically, including the following:

Europe 
 Belfast (Northern Ireland) 
 Knock Down Ginger (England)
 Knock Off Ginger (England)
 Bobby Knocking (Wales)
 Knock a door run (away) (England)
 Knock-a-door-dash (Liverpool, England)
  (Netherlands)
  (Germany)
  (Belgium)
 Knock and nash (United Kingdom)
 Chicky melly chap-door-run, chappy, chappies (Scotland) 
 Knock and run (England)
 Knick knack (Ireland)
 Knick Knock Nanny (Oxfordshire, England)
 Knick Knock (Cornwall, England)
 Cherry knocking (United Kingdom)
  (Norway)
 (Hungary)

North America 
 Ding dong ditch (United States)
 Doorbell ditch (United States)
 Knock, knock, ginger (Canada)
 Knicky Knicky Nine Door (Canada)
 Ring and run (United States)
Sonne-décrisse (Canada)

Oceania 
Knick Knocking (Australia)
Ding dong dash (Australia)

Africa 
Tok-tokkie (South Africa)

South America 
  (Argentina)
  (Chile)
  (Colombia)

Asia 
  (South Korea)
  (Japan)

Legality
Victims of this prank are not likely to call the police, but if they decide to, the prankster can face charges of trespassing and disturbing the peace. In England and Wales, trespassing is a civil matter rather than a criminal one, and the police will not compile a case for a victim. However, under the Town Police Clauses Act 1847, it is a criminal offence to "wilfully and wantonly disturb any inhabitant, by pulling or ringing any door bell, or knocking at any door" punishable with up to 14 days' imprisonment. In Scotland, although the Land Reform (Scotland) Act 2003 establishes universal access rights, the so-called "right to roam" is only permitted where the privacy of others is respected. Such errant behaviour could be regarded as the Scottish common law criminal offence of "malicious mischief".

Michael Bishop, a 56-year-old man in Louisville, Kentucky, shot at a group of children playing ding dong ditch at his house on 13 June 2011. A 12-year-old boy was hit in the back with a shotgun blast and "the boy was taken to Kosair Children's Hospital with what police call non-life-threatening injuries". The shooter was charged with attempted murder. On 8 December 2015, his final day in office, outgoing Kentucky governor Steve Beshear issued 197 pardons, including a pardon for Michael Bishop.

A 14-year-old Oklahoma teenager, Cole Peyton, was shot in the back and arm while playing "ding dong ditch" in the early hours of New Year's Day of 2016.

Dean Taylor, a 63 year old coach and former San Francisco Police Department officer, was arrested following an incident involving an 11-year-old boy who rang his doorbell in San Rafael, California on 12 February 2021. After two boys rang his door and ran, Taylor chased the boys in a vehicle, cut off one of the youths and emerged from the car. Then he allegedly grabbed one 11-year-old boy by the neck, pushed him to the ground and forced him into his vehicle. He drove the terrified boy around the block, and allegedly told the boy that he would "put a bullet in his head" if the prank happened again. He dropped the boy off near Point San Pedro Road and Loch Lomond Drive, and police were called. Taylor faces felony charges including kidnapping, making criminal threats, false imprisonment, battery and child endangerment.

A California man, Anurag Chandra, 42, faces several murder charges for his role in the Temescal Canyon Road crash on 24 January 2020. After one of the boys had been dared, all six teenagers drove to a nearby home on Mojeska Summit Road in Corona, about 50 miles southeast of Los Angeles. The boy rang the doorbell and returned to the 2002 Prius that they were riding in, and the group took off. Chandra, who lives at the home, chased after them in his 2019 Infiniti Q50. His car rammed into the back of the Prius, causing it to veer off the road and into a tree. Daniel Hawkins, Jacob Ivascu and Drake Ruiz, all 16-year-old passengers, were killed in the crash. The 18-year-old driver and two other boys, ages 13 and 14, were injured but survived.

See also 
 Mischief Night
 Trick-or-treat

References

External links
Our Dialects - How do people refer to the prank that involves knocking on someone’s door and then running away before they can answer?

Children's games
Practical jokes